Trypeta artemisiae is a species of tephritid or fruit flies in the genus Trypeta of the family Tephritidae.

References

artemisiae
Articles containing video clips
Diptera of Europe
Insects described in 1794